Miss Colombia 2002, the 68th Miss Colombia pageant, was held in Cartagena de Indias, Colombia, on November 12, 2002, after three weeks of events.  The winner of the pageant was Diana Lucia Mantilla, Miss Santander.

The pageant was broadcast live on RCN TV from the Centro de Convenciones Julio Cesar Turbay in Cartagena de Indias, Colombia. At the conclusion of the final night of competition, outgoing titleholder Vanessa Mendoza crowned Diana Lucia Mantilla of Santander as the new Miss Colombia.

Results

Placements

Delegates 
The Miss Colombia 2002 delegates are:

 Antioquia -  Carolina Giraldo García
 Atlántico -  Diana María Moreno Hernández
 Barranquilla -  Liliana de Cambil Ávila
 Bogotá D.C. - María Molina Salazar 
 Bolívar -  Brenda María Juan Guardela
 Caldas - Karla Zuluaga Suárez
 Cartagena DT y C - Isabel Sofia Cabrales Baquero
 Cauca - Liliana María Simmonds Villada
 Cesar - Berta de los Ángeles Velásquez B.
 Chocó - Carolina Quintero Schuller
 Córdoba - Sandra Juliana Tous de la Ossa
 Cundinamarca - Liliana Isabel Jiménez Moreno
 Guajira - Sara Elisa Parodi Brito
 Magdalena - Esther María Bornacelli García
 Meta - Andrea Viviana Svenson Gonfrier
 Nariño - Lina Zulema Casanova Del Castillo 
 Norte de Santander - Naidu Patricia Illera Arango
 Quindío - Lina María Maya Giraldo
 Risaralda - Marcela Delgado Rincón 
 San Andrés and Providencia -  Jessica Samantha Pereira Hooker
 Santa Marta -  Clara Inés Martínez Aarón
 Santander - Diana Lucia Mantilla Prada
 Sucre - Liliana Patricia Romero Iriarte 
 Tolima - Adriana Katherine Coca Gaitán
 Valle - Gina Paola Arango Lemos

References and footnotes

External links
Official site

Miss Colombia
2002 in Colombia
2002 beauty pageants